Santiago López Cortés (born 18 June 1992) is a Mexican footballer who plays as a midfielder. He is currently a free agent.

Career
López started in the youth ranks of Inter Playa del Carmen, before being promoted into the first-team in September 2008. He subsequently made twenty-three appearances in his debut season in Liga Premier de México. On 2 October 2010, he scored his first senior goal in a draw away to Itzaes. In three years with the club, he featured forty-one times and scored three goals. In 2011, Mexican Primera División side Atlante signed López. For the 2011–12 season, López made eighteen appearances for the U20 team.  He eventually made his Atlante debut on 2 August 2012 in a Copa MX match with La Piedad.

He made a total of six appearances for Atlante in the Copa MX during 2012–13. 2013 saw López leave Atlante and return to Inter Playa del Carmen of Liga Premier, subsequently scoring once in thirteen games in 2013–14. He left the club at the conclusion of 2013–14.

Career statistics
.

References

External links

1992 births
Living people
Footballers from Mexico City
Mexican footballers
Association football midfielders
Liga Premier de México players
Liga MX players
Inter Playa del Carmen players
Atlante F.C. footballers